Lefteris Christoforou  (Greek: Λευτέρης Χριστοφόρου; born 31 August 1963) is a Greek Cypriot politician.  He has been a Member of the European Parliament (MEP) since 2014 and is Head of National Delegation in the European People's Party. He is a member of the Democratic Rally (DISY) and he served as Vise President from 2003 to 2013 and also as Deputy Chairman  from 2013 to 2019. He was a member of the Cyprus of Parliament from 1996 to 2014 and represented Famagusta.

Political career 
Christoforou started his political activity in the Youth Movement (MAKI), from 1976 to 1981. He continued his activity, during his studies in Greece, in the University Students Movement, Protoporia, of which he was the Chairman of the Executive Committee Protoporia. During the period 1993-1996 Lefteris Christoforou served as the District Leader of the Youth of the Democratic Rally (NEDISY) of Famagusta.

Member of the Cyprus Parliament, 1996-2014 
In the 1996 Cyprus national elections, Lefteris Christoforou  was elected for the first time as a Member of  the Cyprus Parliament for DISY. He was the youngest member of the Cyprus Parliament and received the highest number of votes.  In the following parliamentary elections of 2001, 2006 and 2011, Christoforou was re-elected as a member of the Cyprus Parliament for the Famagusta District,  retaining the lead in terms of electoral votes.

During his term in the Cyprus Parliament, Christoforou served as a Chairman of the Parliamentary Committee on Trade, Energy, Tourism and Industry.

Parliamentary posts:

 Member in the Parliamentary Committee on Finance
 Member in the Parliamentary Committee on Institutions and Values
 Member in the Parliamentary Committee for Refugees and Missing Persons
 Member in the Parliamentary Committee on Home Affairs

Member of the European Parliament, 2014-present 
In 2004 he was appointed by the Cyprus Parliament as an Observer in the European Parliament.

Christoforou has been a Member of the European Parliament since 2014 and he is a member of the European People's Party Group.  He is the leader of the Cyprus delegation in the European People's Party Group.

He has been serving as:

 Member in the Committee on Budgets
 Member in the Committee on Budgetary Control
 Member in the Committee on Economic and Monetary Affairs

In addition to his committee assignments, Christoforou is a member of the European Parliament Intergroup on Freedom of Religion or Belief and Religious Tolerance, the European Parliament Intergroup on Cancer and the European Parliament Intergroup on Disability.

Education and early career 
Christoforou studied economics with a scholarship from IKY and graduated with Distinction from the Aristotle University of Thessaloniki. He continued his postgraduate studies in Business Administration at the Aristotle University of Thessaloniki.

Before his political career, Christoforou worked in the Financial and Banking Sector, in Greece and in Cyprus and gained significant experience in Finance and in Banking.

Personal information 
Christoforou is married to Diamanto Orthodoxou and has a son Panagiotis and a daughter, Loukia.

References

Living people
MEPs for Cyprus 2014–2019
MEPs for Cyprus 2019–2024
Democratic Rally MEPs
Democratic Rally politicians
1963 births